The acronym ISCAS may refer to:

 International Symposium on Circuits and Systems
 Institute of Software, Chinese Academy of Sciences